CBS Columbus can refer to:

WBNS-TV, the CBS television affiliate in Columbus, Ohio
WBNS (AM), a former CBS-affiliated radio station in Columbus, Ohio
WRBL, the CBS television affiliate in Columbus, Georgia